The 1903–04 Cornell men's ice hockey season was the 5th season of play for the program.

Season
After playing a single game during the year, Cornell mothballed its ice hockey program until it could produce an ice rink closer to its Ithaca, New York campus. The program would remain shuttered for two years.

Note: Cornell University did not formally adopt 'Big Red' as its moniker until after 1905. They have been, however, associated with 'Carnelian and White' since the school's Inauguration Day on October 7, 1868.

Roster

Standings

Schedule and Results

|-
!colspan=12 style=";" | Regular Season

References

Cornell Big Red men's ice hockey seasons
Cornell
Cornell
Cornell
Cornell